This is a list of yearly Mid-South Conference football standings.

Mid-South Conference football standings

NAIA Division II (1989–1996)

NAIA (1997–present)

References

Mid-South Conference
Standings